Cheshmeh Nadi (also Romanized as Cheshmeh Nādī and Chashmeh Nādī; also known as Cheshmeh Nāvī and Cheshm Nādī) is a village in Eyvanki Rural District, Eyvanki District, Garmsar County, Semnan Province, Iran. At the 2006 census, its population was 345, in 92 families.

References 

Populated places in Garmsar County